Piacenza-San Damiano Air Base  was a military airport located in Piacenza, Emilia-Romagna, Italy. It was closed on 1 September 2017.

See also

List of airports in Italy

References

External links

Italian airbases